The Nurzec is a river in eastern Poland.

Nurzec may also refer to:
Nurzec, Bielsk County in Podlaskie Voivodeship (north-east Poland)
Nurzec, Siemiatycze County in Podlaskie Voivodeship (north-east Poland)